H. laeta may refer to:

 Hamataliwa laeta, a Mexican spider
 Haworthia laeta, a succulent plant
 Heteropsis laeta, a Malagasy butterfly
 Heterosternuta laeta, a predaceous diving beetle
 Himerarctia laeta, a Brazilian moth
 Histopona laeta, a funnel-web spider
 Holomelina laeta, a Northern American moth
 Hydnochaete laeta, a plant pathogen
 Hypercompe laeta, a Venezuelan moth
 Hypoestes laeta, a dicotyledonous plant